Charles Halkett may refer to:

Sir Charles Halkett, 1st Baronet (d. 1697), of the Halkett baronets
Sir Charles Halkett, 5th Baronet (1764–1837), of the Halkett baronets

See also
Halkett (surname)